Wąsosz  is a village in Grajewo County, Podlaskie Voivodeship, in north-eastern Poland. It is the seat of the gmina (administrative district) called Gmina Wąsosz. The village has a population of 1,600.

Wąsosz received city rights from Prince Władysław on 13 May 1436, and lost them in 1870 under the Russian rule following the Partitions. The already well-developed town was destroyed in the Swedish Deluge of 1655-1656 and then rebuilt. The Town Hall was erected in 1789. Almost all of the streets were paved at around the same time. The Carmelite monastery was established in Wąsosz as far back as 1605, but was closed in 1864 by the authorities in reprisal for help offered by monks to victims of the January Uprising. They were sent to Katorga chained by the neck.

On the night between 4 and 5 July 1941, during the Nazi invasion into Eastern Poland and the USSR, a small group of people murdered several dozens of the Jewish inhabitants of Wąsosz, in what is called the Wąsosz pogrom.

One of the most impressive points of interest in Wąsosz is its late Gothic church from 1508, with three altars adorned with religious paintings. It is at the Old Market Square.

References

Villages in Grajewo County
Łomża Governorate
Białystok Voivodeship (1919–1939)
Belastok Region
Holocaust locations in Poland